"Glorious" is a song by American rapper Macklemore, featuring American singer Skylar Grey. The song was written by the artists alongside Tyler Andrews and producers Joshua "Budo" Karp and Tyler Dopps,. It was released to digital retailers on June 15, 2017, as the lead single from Macklemore's second solo studio album, Gemini (2017). The song was used in a 20-second trailer for the eleventh series of Doctor Who and the trailer for Crazy Rich Asians.

Background
On June 13, 2017, Macklemore teased the single release on social media. He posted a photo of his daughter, Sloane, standing in front of a car, in which the song's title, release date and time were written. He later posted a video that reveals the song's artwork featured artist. Upon release, Macklemore published a social media post, explaining the reason behind a musical break that he and Ryan Lewis are taking as they work on their own music."So here it is. The first song from my new album is 'Glorious'. It features the incredibly talented Skylar Grey and was produced by Budo with additional production from Tyler Dopps. It felt like the right record to come back with, embarking on this new chapter of life."

Critical reception
Edwin Ortiz of Complex magazine wrote that the song "provides an uplifting, anthemic vibe that Macklemore uses to put into focus his own legacy and what it means to truly make a mark". Jon Blistein of Rolling Stone magazine wrote: "Glorious" has rapid percussion and an energizing piano loop. Macklemore unravels a torrent of lyrics that complement Grey's gospel-tinged hook." They regarded the song as "an ode to fresh starts and embracing life".

Live performances
On June 28, 2017, Macklemore made his television debut of the song with Skylar Grey on the American late-night talk show The Tonight Show Starring Jimmy Fallon. Grey handled the piano, with a backing band consisting six background vocalists, a guitarist and percussionist and a three-piece horn section. Arielle Tschinkel of Idolator regarded the performance as "uplifting" and "spirited."

Music video 
The music video premiered on YouTube on July 6, 2017. It featured Macklemore's grandmother, Helen, on her 100th birthday, with the two traveling around Modesto, California, doing activities together such as shopping, egging houses, and visiting an arcade.

Credits and personnel
Credits adapted from YouTube.

 Macklemore – composition
 Skylar Grey – composition
 Budo – production, composition, piano, bass, drum programming
 Tyler Andrews – writing
 Tyler Dopps – additional production, composition, synthesizer, additional drum programming, engineering
 Donna Missal – additional vocals
 Raymond Mason – trombone
 Todd M. Simon – trumpet, flügelhorn, euphonium, horn arrangement
 Adam Aejaye Jackson – additional background vocals
 Niomisha Renee Wilson – additional background vocals
 Oren Waters – additional background vocals
 Valerie Pinkston – additional background vocals
 Brenda McClure – additional background vocals
 Harrison White – additional background vocals
 Will Wheaton – additional background vocals
 Bridgett Bryant – additional background vocals
 Josh Rawlings – additional piano
 Jon Castelli – mixing
 Dale Becker – mastering
 Nick Mac – additional engineering
 Sean Kellett – additional engineering

Charts

Weekly charts

Year-end charts

Certifications

References

2017 singles
2017 songs
Macklemore songs
Skylar Grey songs
Songs written by Macklemore
Songs written by Skylar Grey